Melinda Louise Vernon (born 27 September 1985) is an Australian female deaf track and field athlete, triathlete as well as a swimmer. She competed at the 2009 Summer Deaflympics and in the 2013 Summer Deaflympics representing Australia. Vernon won 2 gold, 1 silver and a bronze medal in the Deaflympic events she had competed in Athletic events.

Vernon relies solely on her vision as she is profoundly deaf in both ears. Louise Vernon was also a 2 time Sportswoman of the Year Finalist in 2008 and in 2009.

She has also been competing at the ITU World Triathlon Series.

References

External links 
 

1985 births
Living people
Deaf swimmers
Deaf competitors in athletics
Australian female middle-distance runners
Australian female long-distance runners
Australian female triathletes
Australian female swimmers
Australian deaf people
Deaf triathletes
21st-century Australian women